von Alvensleben may refer to:

 Christian von Alvensleben (born 1941), German photographer
 Constantin von Alvensleben (1809–1892), Prussian general
 Gustav von Alvensleben (1803–1881), Prussian general
 'Alvo' Gustav Konstantin von Alvensleben (1879–1965), Canadian/American entrepreneur
 Kathleen King von Alvensleben (born 1969), American-German architect
 Ludolf von Alvensleben (1901–1970), Nazi official
 Ludwig von Alvensleben (1800–1868), German writer from Berlin
 Werner von Alvensleben (1875–1947), German businessman and politician
Alvensleben Convention, a Russo-Prussian treaty of 1863
House of Alvensleben, a German aristocratic family

de:Alvensleben (Familienname)